Jean-Christophe Ravier (born 10 April 1979 in Avignon) is a French racing driver. He has competed in such series as World Series by Nissan and Formula Renault 2000 Eurocup.

References

External links
 

1979 births
Living people
French racing drivers
Formula Ford drivers
French Formula Three Championship drivers
French Formula Renault 2.0 drivers
Formula Renault Eurocup drivers
American Le Mans Series drivers
Sportspeople from Avignon
Karting World Championship drivers
Epsilon Euskadi drivers